Sir William David Madel (born 6 August 1938) is a politician in the United Kingdom, who was a Member of Parliament for the Conservative Party.

Parliamentary career
Madel contested the London seat of Erith and Crayford in a 1965 by-election, and again in the general election the following year, but was beaten on each occasion by Labour's James Wellbeloved.

He was a Conservative Party Member of Parliament for South Bedfordshire and later South West Bedfordshire for 31 years from 1970 until he stood down at the 2001 general election.

Madel almost suffered one of the biggest upsets of the 1997 general election, when his majority was cut from the 1992 result of 21,273, to just 132 votes.

References

External links
Guardian Unlimited Politics for Sir David Madel, includes information about Voting History, Jobs and committees, Full biography
 

1938 births
Living people
Conservative Party (UK) MPs for English constituencies
UK MPs 1970–1974
UK MPs 1974
UK MPs 1974–1979
UK MPs 1979–1983
UK MPs 1983–1987
UK MPs 1987–1992
UK MPs 1992–1997
UK MPs 1997–2001
Knights Bachelor
Politicians awarded knighthoods